Neumichtis is a genus of moths of the family Noctuidae.

Species
 Neumichtis adamantina (Turner, 1906)
 Neumichtis archephanes Turner, 1920
 Neumichtis callisina (Turner, 1902)
 Neumichtis expulsa (Guenée, 1852)
 Neumichtis iorrhoa (Meyrick, 1902)
 Neumichtis mesophaea (Hampson, 1906)
 Neumichtis nigerrima (Guenée, 1852)
 Neumichtis prolifera (Walker, 1856)
 Neumichtis saliaris (Guenée, 1852)
 Neumichtis sepultrix (Guenée, 1852)
 Neumichtis signata (Lower, 1905)
 Neumichtis spumigera (Guenée, 1852)

References
Natural History Museum Lepidoptera genus database
Neumichtis at funet

Cuculliinae